Lalremsiami Hmarzote (born 30 March 2000) is an Indian professional field hockey player who plays as a forward and occasionally as a halfback for the Indian national team. At the club level, she plays for Sports Authority of India. Hmarzote was a part of the 18-member squad that represented India at the 2018 World Cup. At the Asian Games that followed, she became the first sportsperson from Mizoram to win an Asian medal after she won silver.

Early life
Her father, Lalthansanga Zote (d. 2019), served in the Indian army and later worked as a farmer and her mother, Lalzarmawii, a homemaker. Lalremsiami was selected to a hockey academy run by the government of Mizoram in Thenzawl, Serchhip when she was 11. In 2016, she joined the National Hockey Academy in New Delhi. Struggling with Hindi during this time, she picked up the language with the help of teammates who call her 'Siami', a shortened nickname of her full name.

Career

2016–2020: Youth level and early international career 
Hmarzote was included in the under-18 India side that played at the Asia Cup in 2016, before being drafted to the senior camp the following year by Baljit Singh Saini, then coach of the junior team. She represented the U-18 side at Asian Youth Olympic Games qualifier, that her side finished second in. Hmarzote finished the tournament scoring seven goals in five games. Hmarzote was first included in the senior team for its tour of Europe in September 2017. She was again included in the squad for India's victorious Asia Cup campaign that year,  the win coming after 13 years. Her first goal came against Singapore in a 10–0 win in a group-stage fixture. In the 2018 Asian Champions Trophy, Hmarzote played for a total of 31 minutes on the field across five matches scoring two goals, including an equalizer in a crucial final round-robin match, and was named the tournament's 'U-21 rising star award'. India won silver in the campaign.

Hmarzote was included in the squad for the 2018 World Cup as India's youngest player at 18. After strong performances in the league games, Hmarzote scored her first and only goal of the tournament in the crossover match against Italy. Receiving an assist at the far post sent in off a long corner by Reena Khokhar, Hmarzote scored off the reverse stick on seeing goalkeeper Martina Chirico advance, giving her side an early 1–0 lead. India advanced to the quarter-final after a 3–0 win. Facing Ireland in the quarter-final, her side lost in the penalty shoot-out and finished in the eighth place.

Hmarzote scored four goals at the Jakarta Asian Games that followed the World Cup. The first goal came in the 24th minute of the group stage game against Indonesia that her team went on to win 8–0. She scored a hat-trick in a 21–0 victory over Kazakhstan in the next game; the win margin was India's second best at the Games. Following good performances, her team lost to Japan by a 1–2 margin in the final, settling for the silver medal. In the process, Hmarzote became the first sportsperson from Mizoram to win an Asian Games medal. In the five-a-side event at the Buenos Aires Youth Olympics that year, she helped India secure a silver medal, their first in the history of the Games. Hmarzote scored nine goals in the competition, that included braces against Austria, Uruguay and Vanuatu.

Hmarzote scored a brace against Spain in her team's 5–2 win against them on their tour of the country in January 2019. A win against Chile in the semi-final of the 2018–19 FIH Series Finals meant India secured advanced to the final of the 2020 Tokyo Olympics. Her performances in 2019 fetched her the FIH Rising Star of the Year award.

2021–present: Tokyo Olympics 
Hmarzote toured Argentina and Germany with the Indian squad in preparation for the Olympic Games in early 2021. In June that year, she was named in the Olympics squad, becoming the first female sportsperson from Mizoram to represent India at the Games. Her team was placed fourth, their best ever finish at the Games, and was ranked eighth in the FIH World Rankings, their highest ever. She was subsequently appointed the chief coach, a group A post, under the Mizoram sports and youth services department. A cash reward of 25 lakh and a housing plot were allotted to her by the government.

In November 2021, Hmarzote was named captain of the India national under-21 team for the 2022 Junior World Cup. A few months later, ahead of the tournament, Salima Tete was named captain. India finished fourth. In the Asia Cup that year, India won bronze; Hmarzote scored twice: in a 9–0 win over Malaysia and a 2–3 loss to South Korea in the semi-final. Hmarzote played in the midfield in the tournament as opposed to her traditional position of forward.

References

External links

 Lalremsiami Hmarzote at Hockey India

2000 births
Living people
People from Kolasib
Indian female field hockey players
Sportswomen from Mizoram
Female field hockey forwards
Field hockey players from Mizoram
Field hockey players at the 2020 Summer Olympics
Olympic field hockey players of India
Field hockey players at the 2018 Asian Games
Asian Games silver medalists for India
Asian Games medalists in field hockey
Medalists at the 2018 Asian Games
Field hockey players at the 2018 Summer Youth Olympics
Field hockey players at the 2018 Commonwealth Games
Field hockey players at the 2022 Commonwealth Games
Commonwealth Games bronze medallists for India
Commonwealth Games medallists in field hockey
Medallists at the 2022 Commonwealth Games